Mroczkowice may refer to the following places in Poland:
Mroczkowice, Lower Silesian Voivodeship (south-west Poland)
Mroczkowice, Łódź Voivodeship (central Poland)